Carole Celia Perry (born March 1959) is a British chemist who is a professor at Nottingham Trent University. Her research investigates materials and physical chemistry, and the development of biomaterials for improving human health.

Early life and education 
Perry studied chemistry at the University of Oxford. She remained in Oxford for her doctoral research, supervised by Robert Williams where her research investigated silicification in biological systems.

Research and career 
Perry moved to St Hilda's College, Oxford as a junior research fellow. In 1987, she was appointed a lecturer at Brunel University. After six years at Brunel, Perry moved to Nottingham Trent University, where she worked as lecturer, reader and head of department. Perry spent parts of her career at Harvard University, University at Buffalo and the Weizmann Institute of Science. Perry works on biomaterials, such as silk-silica and silk-calcium phosphate materials for bone repair.

Perry has investigated biosilification and the role of silicon in bone health. In the poultry industry, the fast growth of chickens can give rise to skeletal issues.  She developed a silicon food supplement that could be used to boost the bone strength of chickens. In 2014, Perry took part in the Royal Society pairing scheme, and job shadowed the politician Lilian Greenwood in the House of Commons.

Selected publications

Awards and honours
Perry was awarded a Royal Society Wolfson Research Merit Award to identify new design rules and synthesis strategies for biomolecules.

References 

1959 births
Living people
Alumni of the University of Oxford
Academics of Nottingham Trent University
20th-century British chemists
21st-century British chemists
20th-century British women scientists
21st-century British women scientists
British women chemists
Fellows of St Hilda's College, Oxford
Academics of Brunel University London